Ringo Meerveld (born 21 December 2002) is a Dutch professional footballer who plays as a midfielder for  Eredivisie club Willem II.

Club career
Born in 's-Hertogenbosch, he started his career as a youth player at FC Den Bosch before signing a three-year contract with the club on 2 August 2019. He made his debut for the club on 12 August 2019 in a 2–2 draw away at Jong PSV. Meerveld scored his first senior goal with Den Bosch's first goal of a 2–2 draw at home to NEC Nijmegen on 6 December 2020.

On 31 August 2021, he moved to Eredivisie club Willem II and signed a contract until 2025. THe transfer fee was reported as €750,000, making it the most expensive player sale in Den Bosch's history.

Career statistics

References

External links
 
 

2002 births
Living people
Sportspeople from 's-Hertogenbosch
Dutch footballers
Association football midfielders
FC Den Bosch players
Willem II (football club) players
Eerste Divisie players
Eredivisie players
Footballers from North Brabant